Kings Valley is an unincorporated community and census-designated place in Benton County, Oregon, United States. It is located on the Luckiamute River and Oregon Route 223, the Kings Valley Highway. As of the 2010 census it had a population of 65.

Kings Valley was named after its first settler, Nahum King, who took out a land claim there in 1846. A flour mill was built in the community in 1853. Kings Valley post office ran from 1855 to 1974.

Fort Hoskins Historic Park is nearby, in the former community of Hoskins.

The Valley and Siletz Railroad formerly ran through Kings Valley.

The K-12 Kings Valley Charter School is located in Kings Valley.

The Shrewsbury Renaissance Faire, originally located in nearby Philomath, now takes place in Kings Valley every September.

The Kings Valley Store is currently the only brick and mortar business open in Kings Valley.

Kings Valley had a tavern which burnt down in the 1980s, due to suspected arson, though the case was never solved.

See also
Kings Valley Charter School

Footnotes

External links
Historic Photos of Kings Valley from Salem Public Library
Shrewsbury Renaissance Faire

Unincorporated communities in Benton County, Oregon
Census-designated places in Oregon
1855 establishments in Oregon Territory
Unincorporated communities in Oregon
Populated places established in 1855